Ata Mahallesi is a neighborhood of Yenimahalle district of Ankara province.

The name of the neighborhood was determined by the decision of the residents of the neighborhood by a referendum. It means ''forefather".

Although there is no neighborhood in it, it is intertwined with the  neighborhood of Eryaman, which is the district of Etimesgut.

Infrastructure and transportation  
There are many cooperatives and settlements in the neighborhood.

EGO buses depart from Eryaman 1-2 Metro Station to the neighborhood. There is also an EGO bus from the center of Sincan District. Local minibuses connected to Eryaman station also depart from Ulus.

Population 
The current population is 28,807 people. 14,253 of them are men (49.5%)  and 14,554 of them are women.(50.5%)

Population by years

References

Neighbourhoods of Yenimahalle, Ankara